Luis Chiapparro Moreno (born 19 November 1966) is a sailor from Uruguay. who represented his country at the 1988 Summer Olympics in Busan, South Korea as crew member in the Soling. With helmsman Horacio Carabelli and fellow crew members Héber Ansorena they took the 16th place. Luis with helmsman Ricardo Fabini and fellow crew member Nicolás Parodi took 16th place during the 1992 Summer Olympics in Barcelona, Spain as helmsman in the Soling.

Notes

References

External links
 
 
 
 

1966 births
Living people
Uruguayan male sailors (sport)
Olympic sailors of Uruguay
Sailors at the 1988 Summer Olympics – Soling
Sailors at the 1992 Summer Olympics – Soling